John Westergaard (2 July 1931 – 31 January 2003)  was a stock analyst and founder of the Westergaard Fund. He also as political advisor to Senator Daniel Patrick Moynihan.

Background
Westergaard was born Johannes Westergaard July 2, 1931 in Brooklyn, New York. He was raised on Long Island and graduated from Willams College in Massachusetts.  He became interested in the Democratic Party politics while studying at Williams College in the early 1950s.

Career
John Westergaard began his Wall Street career as an analyst for Standard & Poor's, the securities rating service. In 1960 he opened a research firm with his friend, William Prime. Their company, Equity Research Associates, offered analytical services to small brokerage firms that could not afford research departments. This business was later acquired by Ladenburg, Thalmann & Company, a brokerage firm.

In the 1980s,  Westergaard founded the Westergaard Fund, a mutual fund that focused on finding emerging companies. However, the firm was not as successful as stocks of small companies generally lagged the market during the bull market of the early and mid-1980s. Westergaard funds closed during November 1987.

Westergaard continued to publish research via a mailed - and later faxed - newsletter available to subscribers. Westergaard eventually moved his publishing to the Internet, starting a Web site devoted to small company stocks. He was the host of an investment radio show, Johnny Dotcom's Journal, where he interviewed executives of start up companies, and offered a service to companies in which he tried to monitor electronic rumor mongers and to counteract the stories they spread.

Westergaard also served as treasurer for Daniel Patrick Moynihan from the earliest days of his political career through four Senate campaigns. Westergaard agreed to serve as Moynihan's campaign treasurer when he ran for New York City Council president.  Moynihan lost that race but the two men remained friends, and in 1976  Westergaard became treasurer of  Moynihan's first successful Senate race.

Securities & Exchange Commission Lawsuits

Westergaard was sued by the SEC for securities fraud which they specified as "broadly disseminating on the Internet and through press releases purportedly 'independent' analysis of publicly-traded securities when in fact defendant had been paid ($48,000 by the company) to publish that analysis.". Suit was filed in Southern District Court of New York case #1:00-cv-09776-DAB.

Personal life

Westergaard married Louise Arnold June 1964 in New York. Louise was a theatrical producer on Broadway. Together they had four children.

References

1931 births
2003 deaths
20th-century American businesspeople
American people of Norwegian descent